Public School 7 is a historic school building located in the DUMBO section of Brooklyn, New York, New York. It was built in 1882 to designs by James W. Naughton. It is a three-story, "I" shaped masonry building faced with pressed brick and trimmed in sandstone. It consists of a three bay center section flanked by a two window-wide wing on either side. Attached to the original building is a rectangular two story brick and stone annex built in 1907.

It was listed on the National Register of Historic Places on November 3, 1983. Today it serves as the home of the AMG School of Licensed Practical Nursing.

References

School buildings on the National Register of Historic Places in New York City
Public elementary schools in Brooklyn
School buildings completed in 1882
National Register of Historic Places in Brooklyn